Piotr Wysz Radoliński of Leszczyc coat of arms was born circa 1354 in Radolin and died on 30 September 1414 in Poznań. He was a bishop of Kraków from 1392, and a bishop of Poznań from 1412. A lawyer by profession, he studied in Prague and Padua, where in 1386 he received his doctorate in dual law.

Radoliński worked for the King Władysław II Jagiełło and Queen Jadwiga. From 1391 he served as a chancellor in the court of the queen, and on 4 December 1392 was appointed Bishop of Kraków. He was a signatory to two Polish-Lithuanian acts of union, that of Vilnius and Radom in 1401 and of Horodło in 1413.

He co-founded the Department of Theology of the Jagiellonian University in 1397 per decree of Pope Boniface IX. Radoliński was also the first chancellor of the university.

See also
Church of St. Wojciech
List of Bishops of Poznań

References

External links
Roman Catholicism: Polish Dioceses
Peter of Radolin called Wyszy at www.kul.edu.pl (pdf file)

1414 deaths
Bishops of Kraków
Bishops of Poznań
Charles University alumni
University of Padua alumni
Academic staff of Jagiellonian University
14th-century Roman Catholic bishops in Poland
15th-century Roman Catholic bishops in Poland
Year of birth unknown